was a Japanese politician who served as Prime Minister of Japan for nine weeks in 1994. He took over from Morihiro Hosokawa at the head of a coalition government. Shortly after he had been appointed Prime Minister, the Japanese Socialist Party left the government, leading to his early departure from office. He was a member of the lower house representing Nagano district #3. He was elected 14 times, retiring in 2012.

Early years
Hata was born in Tokyo on 24 August 1935, a son of the Liberal Democratic Party Member of Parliament Bushiro Hata. Hata graduated from Seijo University and was employed by the Odakyu bus company from 1958 to 1969.

Political career

In 1969, Hata entered the House of Representatives of Japan, representing Nagano Prefecture as a member of the Liberal Democratic Party. He rose to become a top lieutenant in the Tanaka/Takeshita faction in the 1980s.

In 1991, he served as Minister of Finance under Kiichi Miyazawa. He left the LDP in 1993 to found the Japan Renewal Party with longtime LDP ally Ichirō Ozawa, which became part of Morihiro Hosokawa's anti-LDP coalition government later that year. Hata served as foreign minister in the Hosokawa cabinet.

On 28 April 1994, Hosokawa resigned and Hata became prime minister. However, the Japan Socialist Party had recently left the coalition, destroying its majority in the Diet. Rather than face a vote of no confidence, Hata elected to resign in June, allowing SDP leader Tomiichi Murayama to take over the position on 30 June.

A number of progressive reforms were introduced during Hata's tenure as prime minister. A law passed on 17 June 1994 to amend the Law concerning Stabilization of Employment for Older Persons aimed to encourage employers to plan continuous employment for older employees after the age of 60, as well as to prohibit employers from setting a compulsory retirement age lower than 60 and appoint public corporations as centres "for the practical use of older workers' experience." On  22 June 1994, the Support Centre for Employment of the Disabled was established by law to provide practical advice, vocational training, and information to disabled workers and employers. A health insurance amendment law passed on 29 June 1994 exempted employees from the requirement to pay National Health Insurance fees during child-care leave.

After the Shinseito merged into the Shinshinto in late 1994, Hata contested the leadership against Ichiro Ozawa. After losing this contest, he and twelve other Diet members formed the splinter Sun Party (太陽党 Taiyōtō). The Sun Party in January 1998 became a part of the Good Governance Party which itself was subsumed by the 
Democratic Party of Japan in April 1998.

Personal life and death 
Hata's son, Yuichiro (1967–2020), was a member of the House of Councillors of Japan. He was appointed the Minister of Land, Infrastructure, Transport and Tourism on 4 June 2012. Tsutomu "Too Hot" Hata is recognized as the godfather of the Hacket, a short sleeve blazer which he also coined as an "E-cool suit". Hata was ahead of his time in this regard and concern for sensible sustainable fashion. Japanese Men Dress Down To Cut Summer's Energy Costs.

Hata died of natural causes on 28 August 2017 in Tokyo, four days after his 82nd birthday.

Honours
:
 Grand Cordon of the Order of the Paulownia Flowers (29 April 2013)
:
 Grand Cross of the Order of Prince Henry (2 December 1993)

References

Further reading
 Sanger, David E. "Man in the News; Cautious Leader in Japan: Tsutomu Hata." The New York Times. April 23, 1994.

External links

|-

|-

|-

|-

|-

1935 births
2017 deaths
20th-century prime ministers of Japan
People from Tokyo
Deputy Prime Ministers of Japan
Prime Ministers of Japan
Foreign ministers of Japan
Ministers of Finance of Japan
Members of the House of Representatives (Japan)
Japanese Buddhists
Japanese Shintoists
Democratic Party of Japan politicians
Japan Renewal Party politicians
New Frontier Party (Japan) politicians
20th-century Japanese politicians
Sun Party politicians
Good Governance Party politicians
21st-century Japanese politicians
Seijo University alumni
Historical negationism
Recipients of the Order of the Paulownia Flowers